Edgar Thomas Conley (April 12, 1874 – August 21, 1956) was an officer in the United States Army who served as Adjutant General from 1935 to 1938.

Early life 
Edgar Thomas Conley was born 12 April 1874 in Fairland, Montgomery County, Maryland, United States of America. Son of Charles William and Martha E. (Larrick) Conley, who owned a family farm called Green Ridge. Edgar was apparently named for an uncle born in 1840, who was a member of the 2d Maryland (Confederate Army) who died during the American Civil War. After graduating from Episcopal High School, in Alexandria, Virginia, Conley attended Lehigh University for a semester and then entered Braden's preparatory school in Highland Falls.

He was admitted to the United States Military Academy at West Point, New York 15 June 1893. In 1905 Conley married Claire M. Conley, who was born in Ontario Canada, but became a naturalized citizen around 1900. The couple met when Conley was assigned to Fort Niagara, New York, and the marriage produced three children. Their son Edgar T. Conley attained the rank of brigadier general in the army and was the husband of Cecile Olive Truesdell. Cecile Truesdell Conley was the daughter of Major General Karl Truesdell.

Military career

Early Years 

Edgar Thomas Conley successfully completed his studies at West Point, where he earned the lifetime nickname of "Sheriff" for mediating a fight between cadets, and did well both academically and in extracurricular activities. Conley graduated and was commissioned a 2nd Lieutenant of Infantry on 11 June 1887. After a brief stint with the US 15th Infantry in the New Mexico Territory, newly promoted 1st Lieutenant Conley was assigned to Company G, 21st Infantry on 1 February 1898. The 21st Infantry was deployed for service in the Spanish-American War, landing on Cuba with the Fifth Army Corps in late June 1898. On 1 July 1898, the 21st Infantry took part in the assault on San Juan Hill outside Santiago, Cuba. Lieutenant Conley was cited for gallantry in the battle, making him eligible to wear the Silver Star Medal when it was approved in 1932.

Soon thereafter, the 21st Infantry was shipped to the Philippines to reinforce the American Army dealing with the growing Philippine Insurrection. There, Conley took part in many operations around Manila and outlying districts, earning commendation from the senior leaders for his skill in the field. Captain Conley remained with the 21st Infantry as it returned to the United States, before serving at Fort Niagara, and back in the Philippines. For a period of time, Captain Conley was assigned as the Professor of Military Science and Tactics (PMS&T) at the Maryland Agriculture College (today part of the University of Maryland).

World War I Era Service 
After the American declaration of war and entry into World War I, Major Conley, along with most prewar Regular Army officers) received temporary promotions in the National Army (forerunner of the modern United States Army Reserve). Conley was promoted to Lieutenant Colonel (National Army) on 5 August 1917, followed by orders to The Adjutant General's Office at the War Department in Washington, D.C., on 20 August 1917. Conley was promoted to Colonel (National Army) on 6 February 1918. Conley transferred to the Office of the Chief of Staff in April 1918, were he remained until sailing for France in September 1918. While in France, Conley completed the Command and Staff College Course at Langres, France before joining the American Expeditionary Force's office of the Provost Marshal in January 1919. There Conley worked as the Chief of the prisoners of war division for the AEF, for which he received a letter of commendation from the Provost Marshal General. Colonel Conley departed France on 2 December 1919, and returned to the United States.

Postwar Service 
Colonel Conley seems to have returned to work at the Adjutant General's office, although he was not officially transferred to the Adjutant General's Department until 1 May 1922. In the interim, Conley was honorably discharged from the National Army on 30 June 1920, and recommissioned as a Colonel in the Regular Army on 1 July 1920. During the same time period, Colonel Conley was awarded the Distinguished Service Medal on 21 November 1921:

Edgar T. Conley, colonel, Infantry, United States Army. For exceptionally meritorious and distinguished services as the Chief of the Prisoners of War Division, the Provost Marshal General's Department. He had charge of and was responsible for all matters concerning the prisoners of war labor companies, escort companies, and inclosures (sic). His sound judgment, marked ability, and devotion to duty resulted in the handling of the delicate prisoner of war questions in such a manner as to produce only commendation. His services were especially valuable to the Government. Address: Care of The Adjutant General of the Army, Washington D.C. Entered Military Academy from Maryland.

Colonel Conley remained at the War Department through the remainder of the 1920s and early 1930s. On 1 June 1933, Conley was appointed as assistant to the adjutant general with a concurrent promotion to brigadier general. On 1 November 1935 Conley was promoted to major general and appointed as The Adjutant General of the Army. Major General Conley retired on 30 April 1938 to due to mandatory age.

Personal life 
Of Conley's children, Edgar T. Conley Jr. followed his father to West Point and was commissioned into the U.S. Army. Lieutenant Colonel Edgar T. Conley Jr. commanded a tank battalion from the D-Day landings to the end of the war in the European Theater of World War II.

In 1927, Conley inherited the family farm "Green Ridge" near Fairland, Maryland. Conley lived there when assigned to duty in the region, and spent his off-duty time in tending the farm. After his retirement, Conley retired to Green Ridge, and devoted his time to farming, family and volunteering at his local church. General Conley died at home on 20 August 1956.

See also

 List of Adjutant Generals of the U.S. Army

References

Sources
 
 
 
 
 
 

1874 births
1956 deaths
Adjutants general of the United States Army
American military personnel of the Philippine–American War
United States Army personnel of World War I
American people of the Spanish–American War
People from Montgomery County, Maryland
Recipients of the Distinguished Service Medal (US Army)
United States Military Academy alumni